Kanave Kalayathe is an album sung by Sachin Warrier starring Leon Poulose, Swetha Raj, Akash Thomas, NeethuKrishna VR, Christy Vazhapilly and Althaf. The soundtrack was composed by Abee Joe. It was produced by Nidhinsha and distribruted by Muzik247. The music video is directed by Deen Shifaz and Ashith wilson.

Music-soundtrack 

The song is composed by Abee Joe, Recorded and mastered at MyStudio, Ernakulam. Lyrics by Mageswaran.

References

External links
 
 
 Apple iTunes: https://itunes.apple.com/us/album/kanave-kalayathe-from-kanave-kalayathe-single/id1228106704
 Gaana: http://gaana.com/song/kanave-kalayathe

Malayalam music albums
World music albums by Indian artists
2017 albums